Nyctimenius palawanicus is a species of beetle in the family Cerambycidae. It was described by Per Olof Christopher Aurivillius in 1922. It is known from the Philippines.

References

Lamiinae
Beetles described in 1922